Dinanath Bhaskar (born 10 March 1963) is an Indian politician active in the state of Uttar Pradesh. Once a close associate of Kanshi Ram, he was a founding member of the Bahujan Samaj Party (BSP) and was Minister for Health during the state's coalition government of the Samajwadi Party (SP) and BSP in 1993. He quit the BSP to join the SP in 1996, rejoined the BSP around 2009 and in 2015 joined the Bharatiya Janata Party (BJP).

In the 2017 state elections, Bhaskar was elected as Member of the Legislative Assembly (MLA) for Aurai constituency as a BJP candidate. This was his third successful election to the Uttar Pradesh Legislative Assembly.

In 2022 state election, Bhaskar repeated as MLA for the fourth time in the Legislative Assembly.

Currently working on the Public Accounts Committee UP Legislative Assembly.

Career 

Once a close associate of Kanshi Ram, Dinanath Bhaskar was elected to the Legislative Assembly of Uttar Pradesh from the Chandauli constituency in 1993 on a BSP ticket. Around that time he was noted as a controversial character in the caste-ridden politics of Uttar Pradesh, much disliked by upper castes for his alignment with Dalits and other minorities and his exhortations to them to become militant.

Bhaskar left the BSP after Mayawati accused Mulayam Singh Yadav of trying to induce support from Bhaskar. Standing as an SP candidate in the 1996 assembly elections, he lost the contest in the Bhadohi constituency to Purnmasi Pankaj of the BJP. He then successfully contested the 2002 elections in the same constituency to become a Member of the Legislative Assembly for a second time. He lost the seat to the BSP candidate, Archana Saroj, in 2007 and left the party after being denied a Vidhan Sabha ticket in a 2009 by-election. He then re-joined the BSP and was made Coordinator of Allahabad zone, Mirzapur zone and Varanasi Zone respectively.

Bhaskar resigned from the BSP on 4 April 2015, accusing it of selling its election candidacies, and joined the BJP one month later. He won the Aurai constituency in the 2017 Uttar Pradesh Legislative Assembly elections as a BJP candidate.

Offices held 
 1993 to 1995:  Member of Legislative Assembly Chandauli
 2002 to 2007:  Member of Legislative Assembly Bhadohi
 1993: Health, Health Education, Family welfare and Village Development Minister (Uttar Pradesh)
 2003 to 2004: Minister of State
 2004 to 2007: Chairman Scheduled Castes and Scheduled Tribe (SC/ST) Commission, Uttar Pradesh
 2002 to 2007: Member, Joint Standing Committee Scheduled Castes, Scheduled Tribe and extinct Castes (Uttar Pradesh Legislative Assembly
 March 2017 – 2022: BJP MLA for Aurai
 2017 to Present: Member, Joint Standing Committee Scheduled Castes, Scheduled Tribe and extinct Castes (Uttar Pradesh Legislative Assembly
 2018–Present: Member State working Committee BJP Uttar Pradesh
 2022-Present : 4th Time MLA Aurai Bhadohi
 2022-Present : Member of Public Accounts Committee,UP Legislative Assembly

References 
Notes

Citations

People from Chandauli district
Bahujan Samaj Party politicians from Uttar Pradesh
Samajwadi Party politicians from Uttar Pradesh
State cabinet ministers of Uttar Pradesh
Uttar Pradesh MLAs 2017–2022
1963 births
Living people
Bharatiya Janata Party politicians from Uttar Pradesh
Uttar Pradesh MLAs 1993–1996
Uttar Pradesh MLAs 2002–2007
Uttar Pradesh MLAs 2022–2027